Samuel Dias Lino (born 23 December 1999) is a Brazilian professional footballer who plays mainly as a left winger for La Liga club Valencia, on loan from Atlético Madrid.

Club career

Early career
Born in Santo André but raised in São Bernardo do Campo, São Paulo, Lino played futsal for a local side before joining São Bernardo FC's youth setup in 2016. He made his first team debut with the club on 21 May 2017, coming on as a second-half substitute in a 1–0 Série D away win over Novo Hamburgo.

On 28 June 2017, Lino agreed to a loan deal with Flamengo until October 2018, and returned to the youth setup. His loan was cut short in July 2018, and he was assigned to the first team of São Bernardo for the year's Copa Paulista. He scored his first senior goal on 25 August, netting his team's third in a 3–1 home win over Santos B.

Gil Vicente
On 30 June 2019, Lino moved abroad and signed for Gil Vicente in the Portuguese Primeira Liga. He made his professional debut with in a 3-2 Taça da Liga win over Desportivo Aves on 3 August.

Lino scored his first professional goal on 2 February 2020, but in a 5–1 away loss against Moreirense. Despite scoring only twice and having only five league starts during the season, he still renewed his contract until 2024 on 29 July 2020, and subsequently started to feature more regularly in his second year, netting eleven goals overall.

Lino scored 12 goals in the 2021–22 Primeira Liga (which also included a brace in a 3–0 home win over Tondela on 8 May 2022), helping Gil Vicente to a fifth position overall and subsequent qualification to the 2022–23 UEFA Europa Conference League.

Atlético Madrid 
On 8 July 2022, Lino joined Atlético Madrid on a five-year deal.

Valencia (loan)
On 28 July 2022, Lino joined Valencia on a season-long loan.

Club statistics

Honours
Flamengo
Copa São Paulo de Futebol Júnior: 2018

References

External links
 
 

1995 births
Living people
People from Santo André, São Paulo
Footballers from São Paulo (state)
Brazilian footballers
Atlético Madrid footballers
Gil Vicente F.C. players
Rio Claro Futebol Clube players
Valencia CF players
La Liga players
Primeira Liga players
Campeonato Brasileiro Série D players
Association football wingers
Brazilian expatriate footballers
Brazilian expatriate sportspeople in Portugal
Brazilian expatriate sportspeople in Spain
Expatriate footballers in Portugal
Expatriate footballers in Spain